The 2011 season of the Belgian Football League (BFL) is the regular season played in the Belgium. The championship game was Belgian Bowl XXIV.

Regular season

Regular Season overview
The BFL schedules two games at one location for saving on transportationcosts for referees and the costs of renting an ambulance and first aid responders. Half of the time, teams are playing virtually at home but actually play at the hosting team's homefield due to these costsaving measures. 

(*)Tournai phoenix gave forfait for the entire 2011 season. The games Tournai played became null and void, as if they were never played.

The match on week 3 in Leopoldsburg (Shotgun's homefield) was suspended due to the absence of an ambulance. In the first quarter a player was driven away to the hospital without a replacement for the leaving ambulance. Rules state that a game cannot continue without an emergency vehicle. The game was rescheduled to March 27.

Regular-season standings
W = Wins, L = Losses, T = Ties, PCT = Winning Percentage, PF= Points For, PA = Points Against

 – clinched seed to the playoffs

Postseason

Most Valuable Players

MVP regular season 
 BFL MVP: #29 Gregory "De Rosten" George
 FFL MVP: #29 Gregory "De Rosten" George

MVP Playoffs
 MVP Black Angels: #55 Soufian Aissati
 MVP Tribes: #92 Stijn Dossche

References

External links
Dale's FFL thoughts – FFL Blog
 Official BFL website
  Official FFL website
  Official LFFAB website
 Official BAFOC website

American football in Belgium
BFL
BFL